Kwangali is a traditional Kavango kingdom in what is today Namibia. Its people speak the Kwangali language. The kingdom has a long tradition of female rulers, among them Kanuni.

References 

 Rundu / Kavango in Namibia - Travel Information and Accommodation

History of Namibia
Kavango Region